McGregor station is a train station in McGregor, Texas, United States, served by Amtrak, the national railroad passenger system. The station was originally built as an Atchison, Topeka and Santa Fe Railway depot. It is the closest Amtrak station to Waco, approximately 16 miles east.

References

External links

McGregor, TX – Texas Eagle (Amtrak)
McGregor Amtrak Station (USA Rail Guide -- Train Web)

Amtrak stations in Texas
Atchison, Topeka and Santa Fe Railway stations